Vladaya is a village on the Vitosha and Lyulin mountains in western Bulgaria at an altitude of about 1000 m. In the 2011 census in Vladaya were counted 4043 residents, which makes it the tenth-largest village in Bulgaria.

Geography and population 
The village is landlocked from valleys, situated comparatively highly in the mountains where Vitosha and Lyulin Mountain meet at the Vladaya River. However, only a small neighborhood falls within Lyulin and the village is mostly situated on the northwestern parts of Vitosha.
The population consists mainly of Bulgarians. There is a small gypsy minority living in the village.

History 
The history of the village reflects the fate of the nearby Sofia city. It is believed that there has been a settlement on the site since ancient eras. The first known inhabitants of the area were Thracian tribes. The settlement was part of numerous kingdoms and empires - Thracian and Macedon kingdoms, Roman, Byzantine, Bulgarian and Ottoman empires.  Over the centuries, different tribes and peoples invaded the area - Macedonians, Celts, Romans, Goths, Bulgarians, Turks, Russians and others.
There is one legend and two alternative theories about the name of the village. According to the first legend, the village's name dates back the Second Bulgarian Empire(1185 - 1396) and was named after one of the three daughters of the tsar called Vladaya. Her sisters' names - Boyana and Yana gave name to other settlements in the area. The alternative theory is that the name is derived from the Bulgarian word "владей" [vladey] which literary means own in imperative, the other alternative theory is that it is simply derived from villa. Etymological studies derive it from the genitive and accusative form of the Bulgarian personal name Vladay. The name of Vladaya was first attested in 1576 as Viladay or Vladay.

Landmarks 
 Tourist track Zlatnite Mostove"
 Tourist track "Tihia kat"
 Sveta Petka monastery
 Sveti Ivan Rilski monument
 Monument of the soldiers killed in the soldier rebellion in 1918
 Monument of Lessya Ukrainka - a Ukrainian poet

Honour
Vladaya Saddle on Livingston Island in the South Shetland Islands, Antarctica is named after Vladaya.

References

External links 

 Position on bgmaps.com
 Position on emaps.bg
 Position on Google Maps
 Уебсайт на район Витоша
 Web Portal of Sofia municipality
 Watershed of Vladaya river

Villages in Sofia City Province